Ontario Today is a Canadian talk radio program hosted by Rita Celli on CBC Radio One. The program is broadcast live from the studios of CBO-FM in the CBC Ottawa Broadcast Centre weekdays, and it is carried on all CBC Radio One transmitters in Ontario. The program generally consists of news reports for the first half-hour, followed by a half-hour call-in segment on various topics.

Interim hosts of the program while regular host Rita Celli was on maternity leave have included Hallie Cotnam and Kathleen Petty.

The program was previously hosted by Alan Neal from 2003 to 2006. Ontario Today launched in 1997 as a province-wide two-hour programme produced out of CBC Ottawa, replacing Radio Noon, which was the umbrella name of five different midday programmes by CBC Radio stations in Toronto, Ottawa, Windsor, Sudbury, and Thunder Bay. Radio Noon, had consisted of an hour from noon to one that was locally produced while the second hour was a province-wide phone-in. Radio Noon continues to be the name of the similar noon-hour programs on CBC Radio One's stations in Manitoba, Quebec and Newfoundland and Labrador.

See also 
 CBC Radio One local programming.

References

External links
 

CBC Radio One programs
Canadian talk radio programs
1997 radio programme debuts